Edge-blown aerophones is one of the categories of musical instruments found in the Hornbostel–Sachs system of musical instrument classification. In order to produce sound with these aerophones, the player makes a ribbon-shaped flow of air with their lips (421.1), or their breath is directed through a duct against an edge (421.2).

421.1 Flutes without duct – The player creates a ribbon-shaped stream of air with their lips.

421.11 End-blown flutes – The player blows against the sharp rim at the upper open end of a tube.

421.111 Individual end-blown flutes

421.111.1 Open single end-blown flutes – The lower end of the flute is open.

421.111.11 Without fingerholes.

421.111.12 With fingerholes.
Anasazi flute
Danso
Hotchiku
Kaval
Ney
Nose flute
Palendag
Quena
Shakuhachi
Sring
Suling
Tungso
Washint
Xiao

421.111.2 Stopped single end-blown flutes – The lower end of the flute is closed.

421.111.21 Without fingerholes.

421.111.22 With fingerholes.

421.112 Sets of end-blown flutes or panpipes – Several end-blown flutes of different pitch are combined to form a single instrument.
Diple

421.112.1 Open panpipes.

421.112.11 Open (raft) panpipes – The pipes are tied together in the form of a board, or they are made by drilling tubes *in a board.

421.112.12 Open bundle (pan-) pipes – The pipes are tied together in a round bundle.

421.112.2 Stopped panpipes
Pan flute
Siku

421.112.3 Mixed open and stopped panpipes.

421.12 Side-blown flutes – The player blows against the sharp rim of a hole in the side of the tube.

421.121 (Single) side-blown flutes.

421.121.1 Open side-blown flutes.

421.121.11 Without fingerholes.

421.121.12 With fingerholes
Bansuri
Chi
Daegeum
Dangjeok
Dizi
Fife
Gakubue
Kagurabue
Junggeum
Komabue
Koudi
Minteki
Nohkan
Ryuteki
Sáo
Seiteki
shinobue
Sogeum
Western concert flutes
Piccolo
Concert flute
Alto flute
Bass flute
Contra-alto flute
Contrabass flute
Double contrabass flute
Hyperbass flute

421.121.2 Partly stopped side-blown flutes - The lower end of the tube is a natural node of the pipe pierced by a small hole.

421.121.3 Stopped side-blown flutes.

421.121.31 Without fingerholes.	

421.121.311 With fixed stopped lower end - (Apparently non-existent).

421.121.312 With adjustable stopped lower end

421.121.32 With fingerholes.

421.122 Sets of side-blown flutes.

421.122.1 Sets of open side-blown flutes.
Paidi

421.122.2 Sets of stopped side-blown flutes.

421.13 Vessel flutes (without distinct beak) 	The body of the pipe is not tubular but vessel-shaped.
Jug

421.2 Flutes with duct or duct flutes - A narrow duct directs the air-stream against the sharp edge of a lateral orifice 	

421.21 Flutes with external duct - The duct is outside the wall of the flute; this group includes flutes with the duct chamfered in the wall under a ring-like sleeve and other similar arrangements.

421.211 (Single) flutes with external duct.

421.211.1 Open flutes with external duct.

421.211.11 Without fingerholes.

421.211.12 With fingerholes.
Native American flute

421.211.2 Partly stopped flutes with external duct.

421.211.3 Stopped flutes with external duct.	
Boatswain's call

421.212 Sets of flute with external duct.

421.22 Flutes with internal duct - The duct is inside the tube. This group includes flutes with the duct formed by an internal baffle (natural node, bock of resin) and an exterior tied-on cover (cane, wood, hide).

421.221 (Single) flutes with internal duct.

421.221.1 Open flutes with internal duct.

421.221.11 Without fingerholes.

421.221.12 With fingerholes.
Atenben
Flageolet
Fujara
Khloy
Khlui
Recorder
Tin whistle
Tonette

421.221.2 Partly stopped flute with internal duct.

421.221.3 Stopped flutes with internal duct.
whistle

421.221.31 Without fingerholes.

421.221.311 With fixed stopped lower end.

421.221.312 With adjustable stopped lower end.
Slide whistle

421.221.4 Vessel flutes with duct.

421.221.41 Without fingerholes

421.221.42 With fingerholes
Gemshorn
Ocarina

421.222 Sets of flutes with internal duct.	

421.222.1 Sets of open flutes with internal duct.

421.222.11 Without fingerholes - Open flue stops of the organ.

421.222.12 With fingerholes 
Double flageolet.

421.222.2 Sets of partly stopped flutes with internal duct.

421.222.3 Sets of stopped flutes with internal duct.
Paixiao

References
 http://www.music.vt.edu/musicdictionary/texta/Aerophone.html
 http://www.wesleyan.edu/vim/svh.html

Woodwind instruments
Edge-blown aerophones